A.C.A.B. is an acronym for "All Cops Are Bastards".

ACAB may also refer to:
 Association of Community Access Broadcasters, a group of New Zealand radio stations
 ACAB – All Cops Are Bastards, a 2012 Italian film
 the initials of Annalena Charlotte Alma Baerbock
 A.C.A.B., a punk rock band from Malaysia

People with the surname
 Balam Acab (born 1991), American electronic musician and producer